The 2000–01 Ivy League men's basketball season was the Ivy League's 47th season of basketball. The Princeton Tigers competed in the 2001 NCAA Men's Division I Basketball Tournament because the team had the best record. Craig Austin, a small forward from Columbia University won the Ivy League Men's Basketball Player of the Year.

Standings

References